Fusarium verticillioides is the most commonly reported fungal species infecting maize (Zea mays). Fusarium verticillioides is the accepted name of the species, which was also known as Fusarium moniliforme. The species has also been described as mating population A of the Fusarium fujikuroi species complex (formally known as Gibberella fujikuroi species complex).  F. verticllioides produces the mutagenic chemical compound fusarin C.  F. verticillioides produces a group of disease-causing mycotoxins—fumonisins—on infected kernels.

Control
The growth of all strains of F. verticillioides is significantly inhibited by an iodine-containing fungistatic (AJ1629-34EC) at concentrations that do not harm the crop. This might be a less toxic anti-fungal agricultural treatment due to its relatively natural chemistry.

References

Fungal plant pathogens and diseases
verticillioides
Fungi described in 1881